Fairview is a village in Fulton County, Illinois, United States. The population was 426 at the 2020 census.

Geography
Fairview is located in northern Fulton County at  (40.636080, -90.169051). Illinois Route 97 runs along the eastern side of the village, leading north  to Galesburg and south  to Lewistown, the Fulton County seat.

Government
The town is governed by the Village Board led by Mayor Tim Harris.

Demographics

As of the census of 2000, there were 493 people, 199 households, and 146 families residing in the village. The racial makeup of the village was 99.19% White, 0.41% Asian, and 0.41% from two or more races. Hispanic or Latino of any race were 0.20% of the population.

There were 199 households, out of which 30.2% had children under the age of 18 living with them, 62.3% were married couples living together, 9.0% had a female householder with no husband present, and 26.6% were non-families. 24.6% of all households were made up of individuals, and 13.1% had someone living alone who was 65 years of age or older.  The average household size was 2.48 and the average family size was 2.94.

In the village, the population was spread out, with 23.1% under the age of 18, 7.3% from 18 to 24, 27.2% from 25 to 44, 22.1% from 45 to 64, and 20.3% who were 65 years of age or older.  The median age was 40 years. For every 100 females, there were 105.4 males.  For every 100 females age 18 and over, there were 102.7 males.

The median income for a household in the village was $32,750, and the median income for a family was $42,000. Males had a median income of $29,643 versus $20,417 for females. The per capita income for the village was $18,677.  About 7.5% of families and 10.9% of the population were below the poverty line, including 20.2% of those under age 18 and 9.4% of those age 65 or over.

References

Villages in Fulton County, Illinois
Villages in Illinois